The Fascinating Mrs. Francis is a 1909 American silent short comedy film directed by D. W. Griffith. The Internet Movie Database lists Mary Pickford as appearing in this short. However, Pickford did not begin with Biograph until the end of April 1909.

Cast
 Marion Leonard as Mrs. Francis
 Barry O'Moore as Young Man (as Herbert Yost)
 Anita Hendrie as Young Man's Mother
 Harry Solter as Young Man's Father
 Gertrude Robinson as The Maid / Party Guest
 Linda Arvidson
 John R. Cumpson as Party Guest
 George Gebhardt as Party Guest
 Guy Hedlund as Party Guest
 Charles Inslee as Party Guest
 Arthur V. Johnson as Party Guest
 Florence Lawrence as Visitor
 Mack Sennett as Party Guest
 Charles West

References

External links
 

1909 films
1909 comedy films
Silent American comedy films
American silent short films
American black-and-white films
Films directed by D. W. Griffith
1909 short films
American comedy short films
1900s American films